Declan Lynch (born 1992) is a Gaelic footballer who plays for the Lámh Dhearg club and at senior level for the Antrim county team.

He spent two years as Antrim county football captain under the management of Lenny Harbinson, before Peter Healy succeeded him in 2021 under Harbinson's successor Enda McGinley.

Lynch was educated at Bunscoil Phobal Féirste and Scoil Mhuire. He attended the University of Ulster, where he studied politics and criminology, and later completed a master's degree. He is a fluent speaker of the Irish language. After working for the Bank of Ireland, he became a political adviser.

Lynch has had surgery five times on his hips (twice on the right and three times on the left) over a period of seven years, after first injuring himself while playing for Antrim when he was 16. The first operation was done in 2012, also the year he made his Antrim senior debut. Lynch had mild symptoms of COVID-19 from which he recovered in mid-2020. His father Martin managed Lámh Dhearg to an Antrim Senior Football Championship in 2017.

He also plays hurling for the Lámh Dhearg club, winning the 2016 Antrim and Ulster Junior Hurling Championship, but he has since dedicated himself to football.

References

1992 births
Living people
Advisors
Alumni of Ulster University
Antrim inter-county Gaelic footballers
Bank of Ireland people
Dual players
Lámh Dhearg Gaelic footballers
Lámh Dhearg hurlers